New York State Route 338 may refer to:

New York State Route 338 (1930s) in Allegany and Steuben Counties, from Whitesville southeast to Pennsylvania
New York State Route 338 (1940s–1980) in Saratoga County
New York State Route 338 (1980–1996) in Washington County